Dead Bees Records is a French independent record label, with a roster of indie rock artists and bands.

History
Dead Bees Records was started in 2003 by two Toulouse-based musicians, Seb Wood (from Call Me Loretta) and Seb Duclos (from the Nova Express, Fuck Buddies), under the terms of an unincorporated association.

The label was named after a quote from the Howard Hawks movie To Have and Have Not: "Was you ever bit by a dead bee?".

The label was initially intended to release the debut recordings by Call Me Loretta or the Nova Express, but soon expanded its scope by importing or promoting international acts. Dead Bees was the first French label to work with Bomp! Records, The Committee to Keep Music Evil and Celluloid Dreams to bring the Brian Jonestown Massacre to French audiences.

Dead Bees later added numerous French, U.S. and British artists to its roster, and has earned acclaim for the label's yearly record sampler, released through creative commons license.

Black Bees Records, the African division of Dead Bees Records, was created in 2014. The first release was Nigerian band Laïka's debut album.

Roster

Current roster 

 All in The Golden Afternoon
 Alone In 1982
 The Black Feathers
 Brian Coatsie
 Call Me Loretta
 The Chemistry Set
 Cotton Club 
 D. Trevlon
 The Dalaï Lama Rama Fa Fa Fa
 Dan Alfresco
 Dead Horse One
 E Becomes I
 Fuck Buddies
 Haze Parade
 Helluvah
 Kingdom of the Holy Sun
 The Lovetones
 Moloko Velocet
 My Lovely Underground
 Recife 
 Savage 
 Sky Parade
 Sleep Talker
 Spindrift 
 Sunsplit
 The Rusty Bells

Previous bands 

 A Poplar
 The Arrogants
 Asteroid No.4
 The Black Angels
 Blitzen Trapper
 The Brian Jonestown Massacre
 The Clerks
 Cobson
 De neuve
 The December Sound
 Director's Cut
 Henri Joel
 Let's Go Sailing
 Moore:music
 The Nova Express
 The Quarter After
 Rick Bain
 Soltero
 Sounds in the Olive Grove
 The Temporary Thing

See also 
 List of record labels

References

External links
 Dead Bees records' Official site

French independent record labels
Record labels established in 2003
Indie rock record labels
Alternative rock record labels